The 2004–05 FIS Cross-Country World Cup was the 24th official World Cup season in cross-country skiing for men and women. The season began in Düsseldorf, Germany on 23 October 2004 and was concluded in Falun, Sweden on 20 March 2005. The overall winners were Marit Bjørgen and Axel Teichmann.

Calendar

Men

Women

Men's team

Women's team

Men's standings

Overall

Distance

Sprint

Women's standings

Overall

Distance

Sprint

Nations Cup

Overall

Men

Women

Achievements
Victories in this World Cup (all-time number of victories as of 2004–05 season in parentheses)

Men
 , 3 (5) first places
 , 3 (4) first places
 , 2 (8) first places
 , 2 (6) first places
 , 2 (3) first places
 , 1 (7) first place
 , 1 (3) first place
 , 1 (2) first place
 , 1 (1) first place
 , 1 (1) first place
 , 1 (1) first place
 , 1 (1) first place
 , 1 (1) first place

Women
 , 10 (20) first places
 , 2 (15) first places
 , 2 (13) first places
 , 2 (3) first places
 , 1 (16) first place
 , 1 (1) first place
 , 1 (1) first place
 , 1 (1) first place

Retirements

References

External links
fis-ski.com

FIS Cross-Country World Cup seasons
World Cup 2004-05
World Cup 2004-05